Lake Township, Nebraska may refer to one of the following places in the U.S. state of Nebraska:

 Lake Township, Holt County, Nebraska
 Lake Township, Phelps County, Nebraska

See also
 Silver Lake Township, Adams County, Nebraska
 Lake Township (disambiguation)

Nebraska township disambiguation pages